Mark Corrigan may refer to:

 Mark Corrigan (Peep Show), a character on the British TV series Peep Show
 Mark Corrigan (hurler) (born 1960), retired Irish hurler